Aaby or Åby may refer to:

Aaby, Aarhus, a suburb in Denmark
Nørre Aaby, a town in Denmark 
Åby Racetrack in Mölndal, Sweden
Åby, Norrköping Municipality, a locality in Östergötland, Sweden
Åby, Växjö Municipality, a locality in Småland, Sweden

People with the surname
Erik Aaby (born 1947), Norwegian rally driver
Gunnar Aaby (1895–1966), Danish footballer
Peter Aaby (born 1944), Danish scientist